Ministry of Transport and Maritime Economy of Poland since 2001 has been included in the competence of the Ministry of Infrastructure.

Ministers of Transport and Marine Economy

External links
 Official government website of Poland

Poland, Transport, Construction and Marine Economy
Transport, Construction and Maritime Economy
Poland, Transport, Construction and Maritime Economy
Poland
Poland
Transport organisations based in Poland
1989 establishments in Poland